Danny Batten (born December 8, 1987) is a former American football defensive end. He was drafted in the 6th round of the 2010 NFL Draft by the Buffalo Bills out of South Dakota State, the first Jackrabbit to be drafted since Steve Heiden was drafted in 1999 NFL Draft.

College career 
Batten played in all 46 games at defensive end in his four years at South Dakota State, starting 45 of the games. In 2009, his senior season, he was named the Missouri Valley Football Conference Co-Defensive Player of the Year after finishing with 86 tackles, 9 sacks, and 25 QB pressures.

Professional career

Buffalo Bills 
Batten signed a four-year deal with the Bills on June 3, 2010. He had switched from defensive end to outside linebacker with the Bills. On August 22, he was placed on Injured Reserve with a shoulder injury, effectively ending his rookie season.

He was released by the Bills on August 26, 2012.

References

External links 
 Buffalo Bills bio

1987 births
Living people
American football linebackers
Buffalo Bills players
Players of American football from Phoenix, Arizona
South Dakota State Jackrabbits football players